Chyunsan Mok Man-wai (Chinese: 全身莫文蔚) is a 1996 Cantonese language pop album by Karen Mok. A version for Mandarin markets with a more decorous cover showing only Mok's face was released for mainland China and Taiwan, though Mok's first album specifically created for, and achieving great success in the Mandarin markets, did not come till the following year with To Be.

Track listing (Cantonese version)
Sung in Cantonese, but transcription in Mandarin pinyin
 Cháoshī 潮湿 Damp 
 Qíngrén kàn jiàn 情人看剑 Lover to see the sword 
 Sèqíng nánnǚ  色情男女(Karen独唱版) Erotica 
 Fēirén shēnghuó 飞人生活(一) Trapeze life 
 Fú shā 浮沙 Quicksand 
 Wǒ bù xūyào liánmǐn 我不需要怜悯 I do not need pity 
 Àilìsī yǒngyuǎn zhù zài zhèlǐ 爱丽丝永远住在这里 Alice lives here forever 
 Lǎo dìfāng 老地方 Old place 
 Shuí hé shuí 谁和谁 Whom and who 
 Fēirén shēnghuó  飞人生活(二) Trapeze life 2
 Bǐ yè gèng hēi 比夜更黑 Blacker than night
 Wèiliǎo qíng 未了情 Unfinished love 
 Dàole wǎnshàng 到了晚上 When evening comes
 Zěnmele 怎么了 How?
 Fēirén shēnghuó  飞人生活(三) Trapeze life (three)

References

1996 albums
Karen Mok albums
Cantonese-language albums